Make The Music 2000 is the debut studio album by American beatboxer and hip hop artist Rahzel. It was released on August 10, 1999 via MCA Records. Production was handled by several record producers, including Bob Power, Marley Marl, Pete Rock, Scott Storch, L.E.S. and Rahzel himself. The album also features guest appearances from Aaron Hall, Emanon, Erykah Badu, Q-Tip, Scratch, Slick Rick, The Roots, TJ Swan and Vinia Mojica among others.

The album peaked at number 51 on the US Billboard 200, and spawned two charted singles: "Southern Gul" and "All I Know". "All I Know" was featured in NBA Live 2000.

Critical reception

The album was reviewed in the Daily Nebraskan, which summarized that "the record fits together like a collage, with some pieces that certainly seem out of place" giving it a C+ overall. The Village Voice critic Robert Christgau highlighted "Southern Girl" and "Night Riders" while summarizing up the album as "having fun with the human beatbox (and friends) in the studio (and on stage)".

Track listing 

Notes
Track 16 contains a hidden track that is a battle between Rahzel & Kenny Muhammad The Human Orchestra vs. DJ Skribble & DJ Slinky

Charts
Album

References

External links

1999 albums
Rahzel albums
MCA Records albums
Albums produced by Pete Rock
Albums produced by Marley Marl
Albums produced by Scott Storch
Albums produced by L.E.S. (record producer)